Deliberate Prose - Essays 1952 to 1995
is a collection of essays penned by Allen Ginsberg in the years 1952 to 1995.  The writer and poet was consistently outspoken and passionate about his beliefs. The essays are arranged by subject and include commentary on such themes as China, Vietnam, and the 1968 Democratic National Convention in Chicago.

References

Works by Allen Ginsberg
Beat Generation
American essay collections
2000 non-fiction books
HarperCollins books